Hell's Bloody Devils (also known as The Fakers and Operation M) is a 1970 American film directed by Al Adamson and written by Jerry Evans.

Plot
FBI agent Mark Adams (John Gabriel) poses as a member of a Las Vegas crime syndicate in order to infiltrate the hideout of a neo-Nazi group. Led by World War II Nazi war criminal Count von Delberg (Kent Taylor), the group prints counterfeit U.S. dollars, which they plan to circulate to help finance their party. Adams is aided from an undercover Israeli agent (Vicki Volante) whose parents were killed by von Delberg during the war; the count has in turn recruited a vicious Swastika-clad motorcycle gang, the Bloody Devils, to do his dirty work.

Cast

Production
Shooting began in 1967 as a spy thriller under the working title Operation M, and then the film was subsequently retitled The Fakers. However, after the film couldn't be sold to a proper distributor, new footage featuring bikers was filmed, incorporated into the plot, and released through Adamson's and producer Sam Sherman's own newly-formed at the time Independent-International Pictures in 1970. According to Tom Weaver's book, It Came from Horrorwood, the bikers used in the film were from a real motorcycle gang and were busted for carrying weapons during production.

Colonel Sanders makes an uncredited cameo appearance inside one of his restaurants, where the protagonists are dining. KFC paid for product placement and also fed the cast and crew.

Nelson Riddle is co-credited as the composer of the opening titles' theme song, however, he was not involved with the production of the film. Sherman and Adamson bought the rights to a pre-existing Riddle cue and used it in the titles.

Reception
A short review of the film by Howard Thompson of The New York Times referred to the use of young motorbike riders he descried as "brutes" to be "box-office bait". He also expressed dismay at seeing Broderick Crawford, Scott Brady and Kent Taylor's involvement in the "smoking out" of a Nazi-minded counterfeiter. The review by Peter Roberts of The Grindhouse Cinema Database noted the "funky psychedelic" opening credits montage which he described as "real cool." He also said that "this was more of an espionage film than a biker film." He said that the advertising of the film was to bring in the drive-in audiences. He also said that it was entertaining and those who were "looking for a Hells Angels on Wheels" wouldn't find it in this one. Instead, viewers would get "a crazy mash up of babes, neo-Nazis, sexy bikers spies, undercover cops and shootouts."

References

External links

Reviews
 RideApart: Review by Bryan Wood
 DVD Drive-In: Review by George R. Reis
 DVD Talk: Review by Ian Jane
 The Grindhouse Cinema Database: Review by Peter Roberts

Films directed by Al Adamson
Films set in the Las Vegas Valley
Outlaw biker films
Television series about neo-Nazism
1970s English-language films